Tsedenjavyn Lkhamjav (12 September 1940 – 15 February 2019) was a Mongolian speed skater. She competed in two events at the 1964 Winter Olympics.

References

External links
 

1940 births
2019 deaths
Mongolian female speed skaters
Olympic speed skaters of Mongolia
Speed skaters at the 1964 Winter Olympics
People from Töv Province
20th-century Mongolian women